Bebe's Kids is a side-scrolling beat 'em up video game developed by Radical Entertainment that was released for the Super Nintendo Entertainment System in 1994. It is based on the 1992 animated film of the same title.

Gameplay

Similar to both Konami's The Simpsons and Kaneko's B. Rap Boys: Players must watch out for security guards, disgruntled mascots, and pirates (that are employees of the theme park). Other stages include a haunted house, a pirate ship, and the pits. Both characters have their own special attacks.

Reception

Nintendo Power stated that the game had "nice graphics and sound" while noting "extremely slow action. Enemies take huge amounts of damage so battles seem endless" and "poor play control".

Nintendo Power also referred to it as the worst game of all time.

References

External links

1994 video games
Beat 'em ups
North America-exclusive video games
Radical Entertainment games
Side-scrolling video games
Super Nintendo Entertainment System games
Super Nintendo Entertainment System-only games
Video games based on films
Video games developed in Canada
Video games set in amusement parks
Single-player video games
Video games about children
Video games featuring black protagonists
Video games featuring female protagonists